was the twelfth of the sixty-nine stations of the Nakasendō. It is located in the present-day city of Takasaki, Gunma Prefecture, Japan.

History
Kuragano-shuku was an intersection between the Nakasendō and the Nikkō Reiheishi Kaidō. Travelers coming from Kyoto would use this route to get to Nikkō. (If they were coming from Edo, they would have used the Nikkō Kaidō.) During the Edo period, it was a popular port for trader ships on the Karasu River.

Neighboring post towns
Nakasendō
Shinmachi-shuku - Kuragano-shuku - Takasaki-shuku
Nikkō Reiheishi Kaidō
Kuragano-shuku (starting location) - Tamamura-shuku

References

Stations of the Nakasendō
Post stations in Gunma Prefecture